The Bigsby vibrato tailpiece (or Bigsby for short) is a type of mechanical vibrato device for electric guitar designed by Paul Bigsby and produced by the Bigsby Electric Guitar Company (currently an independently operated subsidiary of Fender Musical Instruments Corporation). The device allows musicians to bend the pitch of notes or entire chords with their pick hand for various effects.

Bigsby was inspired to create a new vibrato system after being tasked by Merle Travis to repair the Kauffman Vibrola on his Gibson L-10. The Bigsby system would debut in 1951, with the first example going to Travis. By the mid 1950s, Bigsby had ceased production of his own guitars and began only producing a range of vibrato tailpieces.

Design

The Bigsby vibrato unit is installed on the top of the guitar and includes a 'rocking bridge', not a 'roller bridge'. The lever arm of the Bigsby is spring-loaded and attached to a pivoting metal bar, around which the strings of the guitar are installed. In the neutral or unused position, the pressure of the spring counterbalances the pull of the strings, resulting in constant pitch when the strings are played.  When the arm of the Bigsby is pushed down towards the top of the guitar, the bridge rocks forward causing the strings to loosen, lowering their pitch.  When the arm is released, the strings return to normal pitch. The arm may also be lifted to raise the pitch of the strings. The Bigsby is highly controllable within its range of motion and usually requires little force to operate. It is ideally suited to musicians who use slow, subtle, or extended bends. It has limited range compared to vibrato units using longer springs contained internally.  Competing units, like the Floyd Rose and the Fender synchronized tremolo (or strat-style) are therefore preferred by some players. 

Bigsby vibratos are still factory-installed on a variety of electric guitars, including certain instruments branded as PRS (Starla), Epiphone, Fender, Gibson, Gretsch, Guild, Hamer, Ibanez, and Schecter Guitar Research, as well as luthiers companies such as MotorAve. Many electric guitars can also be retrofitted with a Bigsby, which requires no additional routing, but may require additional holes to be drilled. Adapters, such as the models sold by Vibramate, can be used to install a Bigsby Vibrato on a  guitar without drilling any holes. Variations in guitars, such as between flat top and archtop, require different models of Bigsby. Bigsby units ship with their own roller bridges, though these are often discarded in favor of more adjustable alternatives such as the Tune-o-matic style bridge or Jazzmaster style bridge.  The roller bridges that come with the Bigsby do not offer individual string intonation adjustment, and have relative string length preset for string sets with a wound G string, rather than for the plain G string preferred by many electric guitarists today.

Ownership
Bigsby was sold by its previous owner, Gretsch, to Fender Musical Instruments Corporation in January 2019.

See also 
Vibrato systems for guitar
Tailed bridge guitar

References

External links
 Bigsby guitars, producer of the Bigsby vibrato tailpiece.
 History of Bigsby guitars.
 Vibramate

Guitar bridges